Prospect United Football Club is a football club from Saint Vincent and the Grenadines. The club placed fourth in the inaugural season of the Saint Vincent and the Grenadines National Championship, now the NLA Premier League. The club was founded in 1982 by a group of beach soccer players. Today the club resides in the East St. George area of Saint Vincent.

External links 
St. Vincent and the Grenadines Football Federation

References

Football clubs in Saint Vincent and the Grenadines
1982 establishments in Saint Vincent and the Grenadines